The World Group was the highest level of Davis Cup competition in 2011. The first round losers went into the Davis Cup World Group Play-offs and the winners progress to the quarterfinals. The quarterfinalists were guaranteed a World Group spot for 2012. The competition was won by Spain who defeated Argentina in the final.

Participating teams

Seeds

Draw
The draw for the World Group was made in Brussels in September 2010.

First round

Serbia vs. India

Sweden vs. Russia

Czech Republic vs. Kazakhstan

Argentina vs. Romania

Chile vs. United States

Belgium vs. Spain

Croatia vs. Germany

Austria vs. France

Quarterfinals

Sweden vs. Serbia

Argentina vs. Kazakhstan

United States vs. Spain

Germany vs. France

Semifinals

Serbia vs. Argentina

Spain vs. France

Final

Spain vs. Argentina

References

World Group
Davis Cup World Group